Chief minister is a term used retroactively by historians to describe servants of the English monarch who presided over the government of England, and after 1707, Great Britain, before 1721. Chief ministers were usually one of the great officers of state, but it was not unusual for there to be no chief minister. 

Under the Norman and Angevin kings, the justiciar was often chief minister. When kings left England to oversee other parts of the Angevin Empire, the justiciar functioned as his viceroy or regent. In the 13th century, after the loss of the Angevin territories in France, the justiciar's power declined as monarchs resided permanently in England. 

For the next three centuries, the Lord Chancellor was most often chief minister. The chancellor served as Keeper of the Great Seal, presided over the Privy Council and Parliament, and led the High Court of Chancery. After the English Reformation, the chancellor's power shifted to the Lord High Treasurer. After 1721, the office of prime minister became the head of British governments. 

This list of chief ministers is organised by royal dynasty. For a list of particular governments of the Kingdom of England, see List of English ministries.

Anglo-Saxons

Normans

Plantagenets 

 1330–1340: John de Stratford, Archbishop of Canterbury
 1367–1371: William of Wykeham, Bishop of Winchester
 1389–1391: William of Wykeham, Bishop of Winchester

House of Lancaster

 1413–1417: Henry Beaufort, Cardinal, Bishop of Winchester
 1422–1435: John, Duke of Bedford, Regent, died 14 September 1435
 1422–1437: Humphrey, Duke of Gloucester, Regent, died 23 February 1447
 1424–1427: Henry Beaufort, Cardinal, Bishop of Winchester
 1432–1447: Henry Beaufort, Cardinal, Bishop of Winchester
 1447–1450: William de la Pole, 1st Duke of Suffolk
 3 April 1454 – February 1455: Richard Plantagenet, 3rd Duke of York
 19 November 1455 – 25 February 1456: Richard Plantagenet, 3rd Duke of York, Protector (Regent) for King Henry VI
 1470–1471: Richard Neville, 16th Earl of Warwick; known as Warwick the Kingmaker; killed at the Battle of Barnet

House of York
 1461–1467: Richard Neville, 16th Earl of Warwick; known as Warwick the Kingmaker
 1475–1483: Thomas Rotherham, Archbishop of York
 30 April – 26 June 1483: Richard Plantagenet, Duke of Gloucester, was Lord Protector of the Realm during the nominal reign of 12-year-old King Edward V (one of the "Princes in the Tower"), before claiming the throne for himself as King Richard III

House of Tudor

House of Stuart

Stuart Restoration

In 1660, the leadership of the Commonwealth recalled Charles II and the chief minister became responsible to some extent to Parliament as leader of a ministry, although much of the time King Charles was in effect his own chief minister. The Glorious Revolution of 1688–89 furthered this process and by the time of Queen Anne in 1702, monarchs had little choice as to who their ministers would be.

Charles II and James II

William III and Mary II

From 1693 and during the sole reign of William III, the government was increasingly dominated by the Whig Junto.

Anne
The Kingdoms of England and Scotland united to form the Kingdom of Great Britain in 1707.

Hanoverian Succession

In the immediate aftermath of the death of Queen Anne in 1714, the monarchy was unable to function as the new King was in his domains in Hanover and did not know of his accession. As a stopgap, Parliament elected Thomas Parker, 1st Earl of Macclesfield Regent, or "acting king" until the new monarch arrived to take his crown. Later, George, Prince of Wales reigned as regent for six months from July 1716 to January 1717 when the King went to Hanover.

In the early part of the reign of George I, who could not speak English, the cabinet began meeting without the monarch present.

Following the succession of George I and the resignation of the Duke of Shrewsbury in 1714, the office of Lord High Treasurer went into permanent commission, its function undertaken by a commission of Lords of the Treasury, chaired by the First Lord of the Treasury, rather than by an individual Lord High Treasurer. From 1714 to 1717 the ministry was led by Viscount Townshend, who was nominally Northern Secretary; the Earl of Halifax, the Earl of Carlisle and Sir Robert Walpole successively served alongside Townshend as nominal First Lord of the Treasury. From 1717 to 1721 Lords Stanhope (First Lord 1717–18) and Sunderland (First Lord 1718–21) led the administration jointly, with Stanhope managing foreign affairs and Sunderland managing home affairs. Stanhope died in February 1721 and Sunderland resigned in April 1721; Townshend and Walpole returned to office.

Thus the First Lord of the Treasury came to be the most powerful minister and the prototype of Prime Minister of the United Kingdom and its dominions.

George I

See also
 Chief minister of France

Notes

References 

 
 
 
 
 
 
 

Political history of the United Kingdom
Government of England
English ministries
Political history of England
17th century in England
1668 establishments in England
1670s disestablishments in England
Ministries of Charles II of England